Non-native pronunciations of English result from the common linguistic phenomenon in which non-native users of any language tend to carry the intonation, phonological processes and pronunciation rules from their first language or first languages into their English speech. They may also create innovative pronunciations for English sounds not found in the speaker's first language.

Overview
The speech of non-native English speakers may exhibit pronunciation characteristics that result from their imperfectly learning the sound system of English, either by transferring the phonological rules from their mother tongue into their English speech ("interference") or through implementing strategies similar to those used in primary language acquisition.  They may also create innovative pronunciations for English sounds not found in the speaker's first language.

The age at which speakers begin to immerse themselves into a language (such as English) is linked to the degree to which native speakers are able to detect a non-native accent; the exact nature of the link is disputed amongst scholars and may be affected by "neurological plasticity, cognitive development, motivation, psychosocial states, formal instruction, language learning aptitude", and the usage of their first (L1) and second (L2) languages.

English is unusual in that speakers rarely produce an audible release between consonant clusters and often overlap constriction times.  Speaking English with a timing pattern that is dramatically different may lead to speech that is difficult to understand.

More transparently, differing phonological distinctions between a speaker's first language and English create a tendency to neutralize such distinctions in English, and differences in the inventory or distribution of sounds may cause substitutions of native sounds in the place of difficult English sounds and/or simple deletion.  This is more common when the distinction is subtle between English sounds or between a sound of English and of a speaker's primary language. While there is no evidence to suggest that a simple absence of a sound or sequence in one language's phonological inventory makes it difficult to learn, several theoretical models have presumed that non-native speech perceptions reflect both the abstract phonological properties and phonetic details of the native language.

Non-native pronunciations may be transmitted to the children of learners, who will then exhibit a number of the same characteristics despite being native speakers themselves. For example, this process has resulted in many of the distinctive qualities of Irish English and Highland English which were heavily influenced by a Goidelic substratum.

Examples

Arabic
General features among most or all Arabic speakers:

Catalan

E.g. phase can be pronounced like face (even though Catalan has both  and  phonemes).
Vowel length confusions.
Rhotic pronunciation, with  pronounced as a trill  or a flap .
Difficulties with word-initial clusters involving , where an epenthetic e is usually added.
E.g. stop being pronounced estop.
Simplification of some word consonant clusters.
E.g. instant being pronounced instan
Narrower pitch range, with emphasis marked with extra length instead of extra pitch variation.
Problems with variable stress.
E.g. the blackbird vs. the black bird.
Problems with contrastive stress.
E.g. with sugar or without sugar? (the second sugar is more heavily stressed)

Cantonese

  tends to be [d], so this is [dis],
 There is less vowel reduction in unstressed syllables, and some variation in the placement of stress.

Czech 

These are the most common characteristics of the Czech pronunciation of English:
 Final devoicing of voiced consonants (e.g. "bet" and "bed" are both pronounced ), since non-sonorant consonants are always voiceless at the end of words in Czech. Some speakers may pronounce consonant-final English words with a strong vocalic offset, especially in isolated words (e.g. "dog" can be ).
 Czech  is alveolar trill. There is a tendency to pronounce the trill in English and in all positions where  is written.
 Final -er (-or) pronounced as syllabic alveolar trill  (e.g. "water" sounds ). "bird" ).
"write" ).
 Tendency to pronounce  as voiced (e.g. "how" ).
 Tendency not to aspirate the stops  (e.g. "keep" sounds  instead of ), since these stop consonants are not aspirated in Czech.
 Schwa  does not exist in Czech. "China" ).
"singing" ), because Czech  is an allophone of  before velar stops.
 Tendency to isolate all words in speech, because the liaison is unusual in Czech.
 The melody of the Czech language is not so strong as in English. Czech speakers may sound monotonous to an English ear.

Dutch

These are some of the most significant errors a Dutch speaker might have:

Pronunciation of consonants

 The voiced stops and fricatives undergo terminal devoicing, especially in stressed syllables, causing feed and feet to be pronounced as the latter.
 The voiceless stops  lack aspiration in stressed syllable-initial context.
  may be strongly pharyngealized, even in contexts where dark l doesn't normally appear in English.
  could pose difficulties for certain regional dialects which lack /h/, such as in Zeelandic and West Flemish.
 The alveolar consonants /t, d, n, s, z, l/ are articulated with the blade of the tongue, rather than the tip as in English.

Pronunciation of vowels

Some advanced speakers may employ a glide [ʉy].
 /iː/ is pronounced closer, tenser, and sometimes shorter than usual. Some advanced speakers might over-compensate for the length with a diphthong like [ëi].
 /ʌ/ is replaced by [ʉ]. Spelling might cause confusion with /ɒ/ in words like wonder, nothing and lovely.
 British English /ɒ/ is replaced by [ɔ].
 British English /ɜː/ is replaced by the sequence in Dutch /ør/, with significant lip-rounding and r-insertion.
 /eɪ/ is replaced by [eː].
 /əʊ/ is replaced by [oː]. More advanced speakers might use the Dutch diphthong [eːu].
 /aɪ/ tends to be overly long before fortis consonants, giving the impression of a following lenis consonant.

French

(as in sheep).

German

 Speakers may not velarize  in coda positions as most native speakers do.
 German has a smaller pitch range, less consonant cluster reduction, and less vowel reduction.
 German features terminal devoicing, which is often carried over to English (creating homophones in cub/cup, had/hat, etc.)
 German features neither  ("the") nor  ("think"), and both are often realised as either /s/ or /f/ (think/sink, thought/fought, etc.)
 The German /r/ is realised differently from the English /r/. Whereas in the former case the tongue touches the uvula, in the latter case it does not.

Greek

  tend to be unaspirated.
 Greek speakers may pronounce the English rhotic as a flap .

Hebrew

 The lack of discrimination in Hebrew between tense and lax vowels makes correctly pronouncing English words such as hit/heat and cook/kook difficult.
 In Hebrew, word stress is usually on the last (ultimate) or penultimate syllable of a word; speakers may carry their stress system into English, which has a much more varied stress system.  Hebrew speakers may also use Hebrew intonation patterns which mark them as foreign speakers of English.

Hungarian

 Since Hungarian lacks the phoneme , many Hungarian speakers substitute  for  when speaking in English.
 In Hungarian phonology, in obstruent clusters, retrograde voicing assimilation occurs, so voiced consonants change to their voiceless counterparts if a voiceless consonant follows them and voiceless consonants change to their voiced counterparts if a voiced consonant follows them. While in English, it's the other way around. e.g. pronouncing dropped as [d r ɔ́ b d] instead of [d r ɔ́ p t]

Italian

Studies on Italian speakers' pronunciation of English revealed the following characteristics:
 Difficulty with English vowels
The main reason is that the letter "s" is always pronounced as  before a voiced consonant in Italian.
 Italian does not have dental fricatives:
 Schwa  does not exist in Italian; speakers tend to give the written vowel its full pronunciation, e.g. lemon , television , parrot , intelligent , water , sugar .
 Italian speakers may pronounce consonant-final English words with a strong vocalic offset, especially in isolated words, e.g. dog .

Japanese

 Speakers tend to confuse  and  both in perception and production, since the Japanese language has only one liquid phoneme /r/, whose possible realizations include central  and lateral . Speakers may also hear English  as similar to the Japanese .

Portuguese

Various pronunciation mistakes are bound to happen among Brazilian L2 speakers of English, among which:

Pronunciation of vowels

The Brazilian  is equivalent to RP English , and English orthography rarely makes a clear demarcation between the phonemes, thus cold (ideally ) might be homophone with called .
 In a British context, the diphthong  might also be pronounced as the Portuguese diphthong eu, .

Pronunciation of consonants

These may be instead fronted , stopped  or hissed .
Speakers may pronounce word-initial r as a guttural ar pronunciations or a trill).
Vowels are also often strongly nasalized when stressed and succeeded by a nasal consonant, even if said consonant starts a full syllable after it.
 Fluctuation of the levels of aspiration of voiceless stops , that might sound like . 
Epenthetic  to break up consonant clusters.
 Palatalization due to epenthetic , so that night sounds slightly like nightch ( rather than ) and light sounds like lightchie ( rather than ).
 Loss of unstressed, syllable-final  to palatalization, so that city sounds slightly like sitch ( rather than ).
 Post-alveolar affricates  are easily confused with their fricative counterparts , often merging chip and ship, cheap and sheep, and pledger and pleasure.
 Absence of contrast of voice for coda fricatives. He's, hiss and his are easily homophonous. Spelling pronunciations, with all words with historical schwas left in the orthography being pronounced  even when the usual would be , are also possible.
 English is less prone to perfect liaison-style sandhi than Portuguese, Spanish and French might be. Often, two identical or very similar consonants follow each other within a row, each in a different word, and both should be pronounced. Brazilians might either perform epenthesis or delete one of them.
These semivowels may also be epenthetically inserted between vowels of very dissimilar qualities.
This means, for example, occasional epenthesis even if the following word starts in a vowel, as in their native language (not really).

Russian

 There is no  in Russian; speakers typically substitute .
 Native Russian speakers tend to produce an audible release for final consonants and in consonant clusters and are likely to transfer this to English speech, creating inappropriate releases of final bursts that sound overly careful and stilted and even causing native listeners to perceive extra unstressed syllables.
However, at least one study challenges this, with Russian-accented English speakers in the study aspirating the voiceless consonants just as much as General American English speakers, and  even more than General American speakers.
 Word-final obstruents are pronounced voiceless in Russian even if spelled with letters otherwise denoting their voiced counterparts, and speakers may fail to pronounce word-final voiced obstruents in English correctly, substituting  for  etc.
 Difficulty with English vowels.
 Speakers typically realise English  as a trilled , the native Russian rhotic.
 Likewise,  may be pronounced like its closest Russian equivalent, .
 Since there is no  in Russian, speakers typically produce  or  instead.
 The voiced palato-alveolar affricate  may  be realised as a sequence of a stop and a fricative:  .
 The voiceless palato-alveolar affricate  may be pronnounced as its closest Russian equivalent, .
 The consonant cluster   may be realised as an affricate, .
 The "clear" alveolar  may be realised as Russian , sounding closer to English "dark" velarised .
 Consonants written twice in English may be pronounced geminated by Russian speakers.

Spanish

Vowel length confusions.
Rhotic pronunciation, with /r/ pronounced as a trill [r] or a flap [ɾ].
  and  often have a fluctuating degree of closure.
Devoicing of final consonants.
Narrower pitch range, with emphasis marked with extra length instead of extra pitch variation.
Problems with variable stress.
E.g. the blackbird. vs. the black bird.
Problems with contrastive stress.
E.g. with sugar or without sugar? 
(the second sugar is more heavily stressed)

Vietnamese

Note: There are three main dialects in Vietnamese, a northern one centered on Hanoi, a central one centered on Huế, and a southern one centered on Ho Chi Minh City.
 Speakers may not produce final consonants since there are fewer final consonants in Vietnamese and those that do exist differ in their phonetic quality:
Final     is likely to be omitted.
 Speakers also have difficulty with English consonant clusters, with segments being omitted or epenthetic vowels being inserted.
For example, when Vietnamese people pronounced the word tie, native English-speakers think that they say the word die or dye.
Speakers often have difficulty with the following phonemes and confuse them, which may depend in some cases upon where in Vietnam they are originally from:
They may also associate tones onto the intonational pattern of a sentence and become confused with such inflectional changes.

See also
 Anglophone pronunciation of foreign languages
 Pronunciation of English 
 Non-native speech database
 International Dialects of English Archive
 Accent reduction
 Koiné language
 Shibboleth

References

Bibliography

Further reading

External links
Speech Accent Archive (most recordings also have an IPA transcription)
International Dialects of English Archive
Articles, Determiners, and Quantifiers

English as a second or foreign language
Non-native pronunciations of English
English phonology
Dialects of English
Language acquisition
Language comparison